Neocancilla rufescens is a species of sea snail, a marine gastropod mollusk, in the family Mitridae, the miters or miter snails.

Distribution
This marine species occurs off Mozambique.

References

External links
 Adams, A. (1853). Description of fifty-two new species of the genus Mitra, from the Cumingian collection. Proceedings of the Zoological Society of London. (1851) 19: 132-141.

rufescens
Gastropods described in 1853